This is a list of all tornadoes that were confirmed by local offices of the National Weather Service in the United States in October 2010.

United States yearly total

October

Note: 3 tornadoes were confirmed in the final totals, but do not have a listed rating.

October 6 event

October 7 event

October 18 event

October 21 event

October 23 event

October 24 event

October 25 event

October 26 event

October 27 event

October 28 event

See also
Tornadoes of 2010

References

 10
2010, 10
Tornadoes